Stand Up is the second studio album by the Contemporary Christian music band Everyday Sunday. The album was released on September 24, 2002 through Flicker Records.

Track listing

Personnel

Andrew Martin - guitar
Chris Hines - drums, percussion
Daniel James - bass
Trey Pearson - vocals

Additional personnel
Michael Tait

References

2002 albums
Flicker Records albums
Everyday Sunday albums